Santiago Fernandez may refer to:

 Santiago Fernández (rower) (born 1976), Argentine rower
 Santiago Fernández (rugby union) (born 1985), Argentine rugby player
 Santiago Fernández (footballer, born 1985), Mexican footballer
 Santiago Fernández (footballer, born 1991), Uruguayan footballer